Walnut Creek is a  long 4th order tributary to the Neuse River in Wake County.  Its source is a small pond near WakeMed Soccer Park in Cary, and it flows generally eastward through several small reservoirs, including Lake Cramer in Cary as well as Lake Johnson and Lake Raleigh in Raleigh, before reaching its confluence with the Neuse just south of Poole Road in East Raleigh.  The course of the creek closely parallels Interstate 40, running mostly along the north side of the freeway.

The Walnut Creek Trail, a branch of the Capital Area Greenway, follows the length of Walnut Creek from Lake Johnson to its confluence, and is the second longest trail in the Greenway System.  A large swampy wetland (which has been partially reclaimed by urban development), occupies the area around the last several miles of the creek; the Walnut Creek Wetland Center, operated by Raleigh Parks and Recreation, is dedicated to the study and preservation of the wetlands.  The Coastal Credit Union Music Park, commonly known by its original name of Walnut Creek Amphitheater, is located near the wetland area near where the creek passes under the I-40/I-440 interchange.

Variant names
According to the Geographic Names Information System, it has also been known historically as:  
Wall-nut Tree Creek

Course
Walnut Creek rises in a pond in Cary, North Carolina in Wake County and then flows east to meet through Cary and Raleigh to join the Neuse River.  Walnut Creek drains most of the southern areas of Raleigh, North Carolina.

Watershed
Walnut Creek drains  of area and is underlaid by a number of geologic formations on its course east.  These include the Carolina terrane, Crabtree terrane, Falls Leucogneiss, Raleigh terrane, and the Rolesville Batholith.  The watershed receives about 46.8 in/year of precipitation, has a wetness index of 429.16 and is about 22% forested.

See also
List of rivers of North Carolina

External links
 Walnut Creek Wetland Park (City of Raleigh)
 Walnut Creek at Buck Jones Road in Cary, North Carolina--USGS Water Gauge
 Walnut Creek at Sunnybrook Drive in Raleigh, North Carolina--USGS Water Gauge

References

Rivers of North Carolina
Rivers of Wake County, North Carolina
Tributaries of Pamlico Sound